Muhittin Akyüz (1870 – 11 November 1940), known as Muhiddin Pasha until 1934, was a Turkish military officer and diplomat. He served for both the Ottoman Army and the Turkish Army.

Medals and decorations
War Medal
Silver Medal of Liyaqat
Silver Medal of Imtiyaz
Medal of Independence with Red Ribbon

See also
List of high-ranking commanders of the Turkish War of Independence

Sources

External links

 Bilal N. Şimşir, "Cumhuriyetin İlk Çeyrek Yüzyılında Türk Diplomatik Temsilcilikleri ve Temsilcileri (1920-1950)", Atatürk Araştırma Merkezi Dergisi, Sayı 64-65-66, Cilt: XXII, Mart-Temmuz-Kasım 2006. 

1870 births
1940 deaths
Military personnel from Istanbul
Ottoman Military Academy alumni
Ottoman military personnel of the Balkan Wars
Ottoman military personnel of World War I
Ottoman Army generals
Ottoman prisoners of war
World War I prisoners of war held by the United Kingdom
Turkish military personnel of the Turkish War of Independence
Turkish military personnel of the Greco-Turkish War (1919–1922)
Turkish Army generals
Diplomats from Istanbul
Ambassadors of Turkey to Iran
Ambassadors of Turkey to Egypt
Deputies of Kars
Recipients of the Liakat Medal
Recipients of the Imtiyaz Medal
Recipients of the Medal of Independence with Red Ribbon (Turkey)
Governors of Adana